TimeSquare – Dream Mixes II is the fifty-seventh release by Tangerine Dream and the second of their Dream Mixes albums on their own label after The Dream Mixes (1995). It is their fifty-seventh album overall. The album, as well as reworkings of past tracks, includes a remix of a track from Dream Mixes One. Further releases in this series were  DM3 - The Past Hundred Moons (2001), DM 4 (2003) and DM V (2010). The album was reissued as TD - DM 2:1 (2007), a mix of tracks from this album and Dream Mixes One.

Track listing

References

1997 albums
Tangerine Dream albums